Dylan Schneider (born October 9, 1999) is an American country music singer and songwriter. He self-released his debut extended play, Wannabe in August 2016. Labelled "Country Music's Next Rising Star" by Billboard, Schneider has landed two EPs in the top 20 of the magazine's Heatseekers Albums chart in under a year without a label to support them.

Career
Schneider was a fan of pop and hip hop music as a child, but later became attracted to the storytelling aspect of country music and began singing at the age of 14. After meeting Brett Eldredge at a concert in the singer's hometown (Paris, Illinois), Schneider was invited onstage by Eldredge to perform a song during the latter's performance in Terre Haute. He then began writing and performing songs both around Indiana and in Nashville, Tennessee. Between 2014 and 2016, Schneider posted a number of videos to YouTube of him performing cover versions of popular country songs, which earned him attention online. The first video was posted on May 18, 2014.

Schneider released his debut EP, Wannabe, on August 19, 2016. His second EP, 17, was released the day after Scheneider's seventeenth birthday and reached number 37 on the Billboard Top Country Albums chart. In February 2017, Schneider released his first radio single, "You Heard Wrong". He released his third EP, Spotlight's on You, on April 14, 2017. The record sold 1,700 copies in its first week, propelling the EP into the top 10 of the Heatseekers Albums chart. Schneider released his fourth EP, Whole Town Talk, in August 2019. The EP was released by Interscope Records through a partnership with Round Here Records; an independent label founded by Tyler Hubbard and Brian Kelley of the Florida Georgia Line who also co-wrote several of the new tracks. It was also announced Schneider would join Florida Georgia Line for select dates of their Can’t Say I Ain’t Country Tour alongside Dan + Shay, Morgan Wallen, and Canaan Smith.

On July 21, 2021, Schneieder signed with BBR Music Group.

Discography

EPs

Singles

Music videos

Notes

References

External links
 Dylan Schneider at AllMusic
 Official website

American country singer-songwriters
American male singer-songwriters
Living people
1999 births
21st-century American singers
Country musicians from Indiana
21st-century American male singers
Singer-songwriters from Indiana